Dato' Abd. Aziz bin Sheikh Fadzir (born 28 April 1963) is a Malaysian politician. He was the Member of the Parliament of Malaysia for the seat of Kulim–Bandar Baharu in the state of Kedah for one term from 2013 to 2018, representing the United Malays National Organisation (UMNO) in Malaysia's previous governing Barisan Nasional (BN) coalition.

Abd. Aziz previously a one term Kedah State Legislative Assemblyman for Kuala Ketil; first contested the Kulim–Bandar Baharu seat at the 2008 election. However, he has failed to win and succeed his elder brother, Abdul Kadir Sheikh Fadzir, who had held the seat for seven terms since 1978 and served as a minister in the federal government.  Amid a large swing to opposition parties in Kedah, Abd. Aziz lost to Zulkifli Noordin of the People's Justice Party (PKR). He ran for the seat again in the 2013 election, this time defeating PKR's secretary-general, Saifuddin Nasution Ismail. In the 2018 election he failed to retain the seat instead losing to Saifuddin.

Abd. Aziz was declared bankrupt in 2014. He somehow said he will manage to settle his debts soon to avoid his parliamentary seat from being declared vacant thus causing a by-election.

Election results

Honours
 :
 Knight Companion of the Order of Loyalty to Negeri Sembilan (DSNS) – Dato’ (1999)

See also
Kulim-Bandar Baharu (federal constituency)

References

Living people
1963 births
People from Kedah
Malaysian Muslims
Malaysian people of Malay descent
Malaysian politicians of Indian descent
Members of the Dewan Rakyat
Members of the Kedah State Legislative Assembly
United Malays National Organisation politicians
21st-century Malaysian politicians